was a village located in Ito District, Wakayama Prefecture, Japan.

As of 2003, the village had an estimated population of 573 and a density of 12.08 persons per km2. The total area was 47.44 km2.

On October 1, 2005, Hanazono was merged into the expanded town of Katsuragi.

External links
 Official village website (in Japanese)

Dissolved municipalities of Wakayama Prefecture